Michelle Rohl (born November 12, 1965, in Madison, Wisconsin) is a retired female track and field athlete from the United States, who competed in race walking. She represented her native country at three consecutive Summer Olympics, starting in 1992. A five-time USA Indoor Champion ('95, '96, '98, '00, and '01) and a four-time U.S. outdoor 20 km champion ('99–'01, and '03), she won a silver and a bronze medal at the Pan American Games (1995 and 1999).

Rohl holds three race walk American records;  in the 10-km walk, 44:17 set on August 7, 1995, in Göteborg, Sweden; the 20 kilometres race walk 1:31:51 set on May 13, 2000, in Kenosha, Wisconsin; and the 15 kilometres race walk 1:08:35 also set in Kenosha en route to the 20 km record.

Rohl won the Masters W50 mile race at USA Track & Field 2019 Masters Indoor Championships in Winston-Salem, N.C.

Rohl broke three American Records for W55 at the 2021 USATF Masters Outdoor Championships in Ames, Iowa: 800m (2:23.26), 1500m (4:54.16), and 4×400m relay (4:23.52); the relay time was also a World Record.  In 2022, she Rohled through the list of middle distances, improving on the 800 and 1500 while setting the 5000 and 10,000 American records, the 1500 and 5000 at the World Masters Athletics Championships.  Her 4:47.63 1500 record was even superior to Sylvia Mosqueda's age 50 record that was never ratified.  A 3000 record was disallowed because she didn't have an adequate number of competitors.

References

External links
 Michelle Rohl at USA Track & Field
 
 
 
 

1965 births
Living people
American female racewalkers
Athletes (track and field) at the 1992 Summer Olympics
Athletes (track and field) at the 1996 Summer Olympics
Athletes (track and field) at the 2000 Summer Olympics
Athletes (track and field) at the 1995 Pan American Games
Athletes (track and field) at the 1999 Pan American Games
Olympic track and field athletes of the United States
Sportspeople from Madison, Wisconsin
Track and field athletes from Wisconsin
Pan American Games silver medalists for the United States
Pan American Games bronze medalists for the United States
Pan American Games medalists in athletics (track and field)
Medalists at the 1995 Pan American Games
Medalists at the 1999 Pan American Games
21st-century American women
American masters athletes